Emma Allen-Vercoe is a British-Canadian Molecular biologist who is a Professor and Canada Research Chair at the University of Guelph. Her research considers the gut microbiome and microbial therapeutics to treat Escherichia coli.

Early life and education 
Allen-Vercoe was an undergraduate student at the Veterinary Laboratories Agency. She moved to the Health Protection Agency for her graduate studies, where she worked under the supervision of Martin Woodward. Here she studied Salmonella enterica and the processes by which enteric pathogens cause disease. She was a postdoctoral researcher at the Health Protection Agency. During her doctorate, she studied Mycobacterium tuberculosis and Campylobacter jejuni.

Research and career 
In 2001, Allen-Vercoe moved to Canada, where she joined the University of Calgary. Allen-Vercoe worked on Escherichia coli. In 2004, she was awarded a Canadian Association of Gastroenterology Fellow-to-Faculty Transition Award. She moved to the University of Guelph in 2007. Her research considers the gut microbiome. She worked with the biotechnology company Infors to create a bioreactor that can maintain biological samples in specific anaerobic atmospheres whilst her research team studying the constituents microbes.

Allen-Vercoe isolates bacteria from human stool samples, places them in the so-called robo-gut and monitors their behaviour in precise conditions. For example, the robo-gut (or mechanical colon) can recreate environments that allow for particular genes and bacteria to thrive, which allows Allen-Vercoe to study the microbiobes associated with certain medical conditions. Allen-Vercoe has identified the general bacteria that exist in all microbiomes, as well as monitoring the microbiome's metabolomics. She has worked on microbial therapeutics to treat various diseases, including Clostridioides difficile infection and cancer.

Allen-Vercoe launched the NuBiyota in 2013, a biotechnology company that looks to grow microbes in a controlled environment. She was awarded a Tier 1 Canada Research Chair in 2019, which allowed her to study the influence of the gut microbiome on health and disease.

Selected publications

References 

Women veterinary scientists
Molecular biologists
Canada Research Chairs
Academic staff of the University of Guelph
Academic staff of the University of Calgary
Living people
Year of birth missing (living people)